Pyar Kiya Hai Pyar Karenge is a 1986 Indian Hindi film directed by Vijay Reddy and released in 1986. The movie stars Anil Kapoor, Ashok Kumar, Padmini Kolhapure and Anita Raj. It is a remake of the director's own hit Kannada movie Naa Ninna Mareyalare.

Cast
 Anil Kapoor as Anand
 Padmini Kolhapure as Usha
 Anita Raj as Shobha
 Ashok Kumar as Abdul Rehman
 Sushma Seth as Annapurnadevi

Songs
"Sau Saal Tak Rahe Ye Zamana" - Shabbir Kumar
"Pyar Kiya Hai Pyar Karenge" - Kavita Krishnamurthy, Shabbir Kumar
"Mithi Mithi Sardi Hai Bhigi Bhigi Rate Hai" - Lata Mangeshkar, Mohammed Aziz
"Tujhko Mai Ye Dile Barbad"  - Shabbir Kumar
"Meri Chhoti Si Bagiya Ki Nanhi Kali" - Mohammed Aziz
"Tujhko Mai Ye Dile Barbad (Version 2)" - Shabbir Kumar

External links
 

1986 films
1980s Hindi-language films
Films scored by Laxmikant–Pyarelal
Hindi remakes of Kannada films